The Reform Candidate is a surviving 1915 American drama silent film directed by Frank Lloyd and written by Julia Crawford Ivers. The film stars Macklyn Arbuckle, Forrest Stanley, Myrtle Stedman, Malcolm Blevins, Charlie Ruggles and Mary Ruby. The film was released on December 16, 1915, by Paramount Pictures.

Plot
The film was advertised in contemporary newspapers as "a drama of home and politics that will reach your heart strings."

Cast 
Macklyn Arbuckle as Art Hoke
Forrest Stanley as Richard Benton
Myrtle Stedman as Mary Grandell
Malcolm Blevins as Frank Grandell 
Charlie Ruggles as Loony Jim
Mary Ruby as May Hoke
Howard Davies as The Campaign Manager
Jane Darwell as Mrs. Haggerty
Fanny Stockbridge as Hoke's Housekeeper
Mary Higby as Nurse's Mother

Preservation status
A complete print is held by the UCLA Film and Television Archive.

References

External links 
 

1915 films
1910s English-language films
Silent American drama films
1915 drama films
Paramount Pictures films
Films directed by Frank Lloyd
American black-and-white films
American silent feature films
Surviving American silent films
1910s American films